Codeine is an American indie rock band formed in 1989 in New York City. They released two full-length albums—Frigid Stars LP in 1990 and The White Birch in 1994. The band broke up in 1994 shortly after the release of The White Birch, but reunited to play a handful of shows in 2012. The band has reunited again for a series of shows in New York and Los Angeles in 2023.

Due to the band's slow and depressing musical style, they are credited as a pioneering act of what is known as "slowcore" or "sadcore".

History
Codeine was formed by members Stephen Immerwahr (vocal, bass), Chris Brokaw (drums), and John Engle (guitar). Codeine pioneered the slowcore and sadcore subgenres of indie rock, but with a more experimental attitude than other bands in the genre, such as Low, Idaho and Red House Painters. The band's original tone, marked by slow tempos, Immerwahr's nasal vocals, and Engle's ringing Telecaster, stayed consistent during their career.

Codeine released their first album Frigid Stars LP on the German label Glitterhouse in August 1990. The album was released on Sub Pop early the following year.

The Barely Real EP was released in November 1992. Immerwahr rejected several of the songs after the recording session. Some of these songs would be re-recorded for the final album. The song "W." is a solo performance on piano by David Grubbs (of Bastro, Squirrel Bait and Gastr del Sol). A somewhat different full-band version of the song appears on Codeine's next album, now titled "Wird".

Brokaw left the band after the release of Barely Real to play full-time with his other band Come, and after Josh Madell of Antietam replaced him temporarily for a US tour, he was replaced permanently by Rex drummer Doug Scharin.

Codeine's final release was the full-length album The White Birch, released in May 1994. David Grubbs also participated on the album. After this release, the band broke up. Doug Scharin continued in Rex and June of 44, and later as the band leader of HiM. Following the demise of Come, original drummer Chris Brokaw became a solo artist and itinerant musician, including playing drums for The New Year and playing guitar with Thurston Moore of Sonic Youth and with Christina Rosenvinge.

Reunion 
In February 2012, Codeine announced it would perform on the request of Mogwai at All Tomorrow's Parties' sister event, I'll Be Your Mirror, on 26 May 2012 in London, United Kingdom at Alexandra Palace, along with other shows, to commemorate a comprehensive reissue of their recordings by The Numero Group in June 2012. Codeine's final reunion show was at Le Poisson Rouge in New York on 15 July 2012.

In September 2022, the band will release Dessau, an album of 8 songs recorded at Harold Dessau Recording in 1992 that was originally intended to appear on their second album, but was scrapped due to production conflicts. Chris Brokaw would leave the band shortly after the album was shelved. Two songs from these sessions would be re-recorded and released on Barely Real, others re-recorded for The White Birch; four songs from the Dessau sessions were first released on their 2012 compilation When I See the Sun.

Codeine's first show in 11 years took place in New York's Union Pool on February 11, 2023, prior to playing the Numero Group's 20th anniversary festival in Los Angeles on February 18 and 19.

Discography

Albums
 Frigid Stars LP (1990), Glitterhouse
 The White Birch (1994), Sub Pop
 Dessau (2022; recorded June 1992), The Numero Group

Extended plays
 Barely Real (1992), Sub Pop

Singles
 Castle/Losida Slide Codeine/Surgery split 7-inch (1990, Glitterhouse)
 Valmead/Pea Bitch Magnet/Codeine split 7-inch and 12-inch (1990, The Communion Label)
 Pickup Song 7-inch (1990, Glitterhouse)
 D 7-inch (1990, Glitterhouse, Sub Pop)
 A L'Ombre De Nous (In Our Shadow)/Produkt Bastro/Codeine split 7-inch (1991, Sub Pop, Glitterhouse)
 Realize/Broken Hearted Wine 7-inch (1992, Sub Pop)
 Sassy Codeine/Velocity Girl/Beat Happening/Sebadoh split 7-inch (1992, Sub Pop)
 Ides/Working Holiday Codeine/The Coctails split 7-inch (1993, Simple Machines)
 Tom/Something New 7-inch (1993, Sub Pop)

Compilations
 A Means to an End (1995), Virgin Records
 When I See the Sun (2012), The Numero Group

References

External links
 Official Codeine site, full discography, lyrics, etc.
 Semi-official Codeine site, full discography, lyrics, etc. - new host
 Codeine biography on SubPop's website
 [ Codeine entry on Allmusic website]
 Codeine entry on TrouserPress website
 Web site for former guitarist Chris Brokaw
 Web site for former drummer Doug Scharin

Indie rock musical groups from New York (state)
Musical groups established in 1989
Musical groups disestablished in 1994
Musical groups reestablished in 2012
Musical groups from New York City
Sub Pop artists
American shoegaze musical groups
Sadcore and slowcore groups
Glitterhouse Records artists